Dadrian LaBreece "Dee" Brown (born May 12, 1978) is a former American football running back and current coach. He went to high school at Lake Brantley High School, where he played quarterback. He played college football at Syracuse and was moved to running back upon joining a team led by Donovan McNabb. He was drafted by the Carolina Panthers in the sixth round (175th overall) of the 2001 NFL Draft.

After his playing career, he went into coaching, initially serving as a special assistant for the Denver Broncos. He then spent several years as a high school coach before joining the college ranks in 2021 as offensive coordinator for NCAA Division II Livingstone. After one season, he moved to Division I FCS Campbell as running backs coach.

References 

1978 births
Living people
American football running backs
Lake Brantley High School alumni
Syracuse Orange football players
Carolina Panthers players
Pittsburgh Steelers players
Cleveland Browns players
Kansas City Chiefs players
Washington Redskins players
Sportspeople from Clearwater, Florida
Players of American football from Florida
People from Altamonte Springs, Florida
Sportspeople from Seminole County, Florida
Livingstone Blue Bears football coaches
Campbell Fighting Camels football coaches